The 30th Punjabis were an infantry regiment of the British Indian Army. It was raised in 1857, as the 22nd Regiment of Punjab Infantry. It was designated as the 30th Punjabis in 1903 and became 1st Battalion 16th Punjab Regiment in 1922. In 1947, it was allocated to the Pakistan Army, where it continues to exist as 13th Battalion The Punjab Regiment.

Early history
The regiment was raised during the upheaval of the Indian Mutiny, by Captain ROT Nicholls at Ludhiana on 10 June 1857, as the 22nd Regiment of Punjab Infantry. The men were mostly drawn from other infantry and police battalions in the Punjab and their class composition was Punjabi Muslims, Sikhs and Dogras.  For the next two years, the regiment remained engaged in suppressing the rebellion.  The regiment took an active part in the Bhutan War of 1864–66, the Second Afghan War of 1878–80, the Chitral Expedition of 1895, and the Tirah Campaign of 1897.

Subsequent to the reforms brought about in the Indian Army by Lord Kitchener in 1903, the regiment's designation was changed to 30th Punjabis.
During the First World War, the 30th Punjabis served with distinction in the East African Campaign, while their 2nd Battalion, raised in 1918, served in the Palestine Campaign and fought in the Battle of Megiddo. During the war, 30th Punjabis raised two more battalions, which stayed in India. All war-raised battalions were disbanded after the war.

Subsequent history
In 1921–22, a major reorganization was undertaken in the British Indian Army leading to the formation of large infantry groups of four to six battalions. Among these was the 16th Punjab Regiment, formed by grouping the 30th Punjabis  with the 31st, 33rd and 46th Punjabis, and the 9th Bhopal Infantry. The battalion's new designation was 1st Battalion 16th Punjab Regiment. During the Second World War, the battalion fought in the Burma Campaign with great distinction. In 1947, the 16th Punjab Regiment was allocated to Pakistan Army. In 1956, it was merged with the 1st, 14th and 15th Punjab Regiments to form one large Punjab Regiment, and 1/16th Punjab was redesignated as 13 Punjab. In 1948, the battalion fought in the war with India in Kashmir, while during the 1965 Indo-Pakistan War, it fought in the Chhamb-Jaurian Sector. In 1971, it served in Sialkot Sector.

Genealogy
1857 22nd Regiment of Punjab Infantry
1861 34th Regiment of Bengal Native Infantry
1861 30th Regiment of Bengal Native Infantry
1864 30th (Punjab) Regiment of Bengal Native Infantry
1885 30th (Punjab) Regiment of Bengal Infantry
1901 30th Punjab Infantry
1903 30th Punjabis
1918 1st Battalion 30th Punjabis
1922 1st Battalion 16th Punjab Regiment
1956 13th Battalion The Punjab Regiment

See also
16th Punjab Regiment
Punjab Regiment

References

Further reading
Lawford, Lt Col JP, and Catto, Maj WE. (1967). Solah Punjab: The History of the 16th Punjab Regiment. Aldershot: Gale & Polden.
Lawford, James. (1972). 30th Punjabis. London: Osprey.
Rizvi, Brig SHA. (1984). Veteran Campaigners – A History of the Punjab Regiment 1759-1981. Lahore: Wajidalis.
Cardew, Lt FG. (1903). A Sketch of the Services of the Bengal Native Army to the Year 1895. Calcutta: Military Department.

Punjab Regiment (Pakistan)
British Indian Army infantry regiments
Indian World War I regiments
Indian World War II regiments
Military units and formations established in 1857
1857 establishments in India